Mukesh Khanna (born 23 June 1958) is an Indian actor, talk show host and producer who works in Hindi language films and television shows. He is best known for his portrayal of Shaktimaan, the superhero character in Shaktimaan (1997–2005) and Bhishma in Mahabharat (1988–1990), and also for his appearances in Pyaar Ka Dard Hai Meetha Meetha Pyaara Pyaara (2012–2013).

Khanna was also the chairman of Children's Film Society India, from which he resigned in February 2018. He is also the founder and director of entertainment company Bheeshm International. He is currently running The Mukesh Khanna Show on his own YouTube channel named Bheeshm International.

Filmography

Television

Videos

Web

Films

Awards and nominations

References

External links

 

Film and Television Institute of India alumni
Indian male television actors
Male actors in Hindi cinema
Indian male film actors
Indian male voice actors
Living people
Indian male soap opera actors
1958 births